Red Badge of Courage may refer to:

 The Red Badge of Courage, a novel by Stephen Crane
 The Red Badge of Courage (1951 film), starring Audie Murphy and Bill Mauldin
 The Red Badge of Courage (1974 film), television film starring Richard Thomas